Burgwerd is a small village in Súdwest-Fryslân in the province of Friesland, the Netherlands.  It had a population of around 315 in January 2017. It is located near the Boalserter Trekfeart.

History 
Burgwerd was originally a village on a terp or mound on the Dieperderhimpolder dyke.
In the 13th century it was known as Borghwarth.
The church dating from the 13th century was made from weatherboard until 1726.
There are two windmills in Burgwerd, the Aylvapoldermolen and De Heimerter Mole.

On 21 July 2006 there was a reunion of inhabitants and former residents of Burgwerd. Before 2011, the village was part of the Wûnseradiel municipality.

Population history 
1954 – 438
1959 – 398
1964 – 377
1969 – 339
1973 – 361
2004 – 348

Gallery

References

 Lolle Baarda Van Borghwarth tot Burgwerd (2006)

Súdwest-Fryslân
Populated places in Friesland